Steven, Stephen or Steve Mason may refer to:

 Steve Mason (poet) (1940–2005), American war veteran and poet
 Steve Mason (ice hockey) (born 1988), former ice hockey goaltender
 Steve Mason (musician), Scottish musician, King Biscuit Time as a solo artist, songwriter with The Beta Band
 Steve Mason (broadcaster), American sports radio personality based in Southern California
 Stephen Mason (musician) (born 1975), American guitarist from music group Jars of Clay
 Stephen Mason (MP) (1832–1890), Scottish Liberal politician
 Steve Mason (biblical scholar) (born 1957), Canadian biblical scholar
 Stephen Finney Mason (1923–2007), British chemist and scientific historian

Fictional characters
 Steve Mason, character in the manga series Death Note, see list of Death Note characters

See also
 Stevens Thomson Mason (senator) (1760–1803), American Revolutionary War colonel; U.S. Senator from Virginia.
 Stevens T. Mason (1811–1843), acting Territorial Governor of Michigan Territory; first Governor of State of Michigan.